The Hidden Hitler (the title translates literally as "Hitler's Secret: The Double Life of a Dictator") is a 2001 book by German professor and historian Lothar Machtan. The German original was published by Alexander Fest Verlag, while the English-translated version was published by Basic Books in New York City.

The book discusses Adolf Hitler's sexuality. Machtan argues that Hitler was a closeted homosexual. Among the evidence, he cites the allegedly homoerotic nature of his friendship with August Kubizek during Hitler's youth in Vienna. The book was not well received by historians, who dispute Machtan's conclusion that Hitler was homosexual.

Industry reviews
The New York Times Book Review (12/16/01) - "... But the biggest problem with Machtan's book (which has been translated by John Brownjohn) isn't the reliability of his sources but his mode of argumentation. He accepts what fits his thesis and rejects what doesn't. One feels, at times, that one is reading an internal F.B.I. report from the J. Edgar Hoover era rather than an evenhanded work of scholarship in which the author is ready to be led by the facts. To interpret evidence his way, Machtan employs innuendo and insinuation ..."  

However, the review (by Walter Reich, a psychiatrist and former director of the United States Holocaust Memorial Museum) also concedes that "though Machtan doesn't succeed in proving that Hitler was an active homosexual, he does demonstrate that his life, in both the personal and the political spheres, was suffused with homosexual themes and personalities. In some odd way, this may actually serve to humanize Hitler. But it doesn't serve to explain him."

See also
The Pink Swastika
List of books by or about Adolf Hitler
The Saturday Night Live character "Gay Hitler" possibly based on Machtan's book at Saturday Night Live characters appearing on Weekend Update
Discussion of Springtime for Hitler in the 1968 film The Producers
National Socialist League, also known as the Gay Nazi Party
Psychopathography of Adolf Hitler

References

External links
 The Sunday Telegraph (10/7/2001) said: "the distinguished German historian Dr Lothar Machtan presents compelling evidence that Adolf Hitler was a homosexual."
 Q-online  article by Paula Martinac, a Lambda Literary Award-winning author
 The New York Times  Walter Reich was critical of the book, saying that Machtan's biggest problem "isn't the reliability of his sources but his mode of argumentation."
 The Washington Post  said "the author presents extensive evidence that Hitler was a homosexual and that his fear of his sexual identity being exposed shaped several of his political decisions and key historical events during the Nazi era."
 Die Zeit review by historian Hans Mommsen, "Viel Lärm um nichts" (German: "Much Ado About Nothing"): "Lothar Machtan's thesis that Adolf Hitler was a homosexual is scientifically neither tenable nor fertile."
 Die Welt (10/13/2001) review by historian Ian Kershaw, "Der ungerade Weg" (German)
 Lothar Machtan authorized "The Hidden Hitler" to be scanned in full by Amazon.com  to facilitate search referencing.

2001 non-fiction books
Books about Adolf Hitler
LGBT in Nazi Germany